An order of magnitude is usually a factor of ten. Thus, four orders of magnitude is a factor of 10,000 or 104.

This article presents a list of multiples, sorted by orders of magnitude, for units of information measured in bits and bytes.

The byte is a common unit of measurement of information (kilobyte, kibibyte, megabyte, mebibyte, gigabyte, gibibyte,  terabyte, tebibyte, etc.). For the purpose of this article, a byte is a group of 8 bits (octet), a nibble is a group of four bits. Historically, neither assumption has always been true.

In casual usage, when 1024 is a close enough approximation of 1000, some of the decimal prefixes have been used in relation to computer memories to mean the binary power, but increasingly from 1998, standards bodies have chosen to limit the resultant confusion by disallowing when software displays a binary quantity with a decimal prefix.  Microsoft operating systems still report file and free spaces on a storage device in this casual sense.

Note: this page mixes between two kinds of entropies:
 Entropy (information theory), such as the amount of information that can be stored in DNA
 Entropy (thermodynamics), such as entropy increase of 1 mole of water
These two definitions are not entirely equivalent, see Entropy in thermodynamics and information theory.

For comparison, the Avogadro constant is  entities per mole, based upon the number of atoms in 12 grams of carbon-12 isotope.

In 2012, some hard disks used ~984,573 atoms to store each bit. In January 2012, IBM researchers announced they compressed 1 bit in 12 atoms using antiferromagnetism and a scanning tunneling microscope with iron and copper atoms. This could mean a practical jump from a  disk to a  disk.

See also 
 Metric prefix
 E1 series of preferred numbers
 Binary prefix
 Data-rate units
 Orders of magnitude (entropy)
 Unit prefix#Unofficial prefixes

References 

Data